Rugrats is an American computer-animated television series created by Arlene Klasky, Gábor Csupó, and Paul Germain. It has been described as both a revival and reboot of the original TV series of the same name that ran from 1991 to 2004. The series premiered on May 27, 2021, on Paramount+; it is the second Nickelodeon-based series created for the streaming service. As with previous incarnations of the franchise, the series is produced by Klasky Csupo.

In September 2021, the series was renewed for a second season, which will premiere on April 14, 2023.

Premise
Just like the original series, Rugrats focuses on the experiences of a courageous, adventurous one-year-old baby named Tommy Pickles and his group of playmates and other infants and toddlers.

Voice cast

The surviving voice actors of the titular "Rugrats" reprise their roles from the original series, though the adult roles from the original series have been recast, including Betty DeVille who was originally voiced by the returning Kath Soucie.

Children
 E. G. Daily as Tommy Pickles
 Nancy Cartwright as Chuckie Finster
 Kath Soucie as Phil and Lil DeVille
 Cheryl Chase as Angelica Pickles
 Cree Summer as Susie Carmichael

Adults
 Tommy Dewey as Stu Pickles
 Ashley Rae Spillers as Didi Pickles
 Anna Chlumsky as Charlotte Pickles
 Timothy Simons as Drew Pickles
 Natalie Morales as Betty DeVille
 Tony Hale as Chas Finster
 Michael McKean as Grandpa Lou Pickles
 Nicole Byer as Dr. Lucy Carmichael
 Omar Benson Miller as Randy Carmichael

Supporting
 Henry Winkler as Boris Kropotkin
 Swoosie Kurtz as Minka Kropotkin
 Charlet Chung as Kimi Watanabe
 Hiromi Dames as Kira Watanabe

Production
In early September 2015, it was announced on Variety that Nickelodeon may "seek to experiment with retooled versions of classics" that could include Rugrats. The following day, The Independent announced that "Rugrats could soon be back on our screens too." In July 2016, it was revealed that Nickelodeon was in talks with Klasky Csupo and Paul Germain about a possible revival of the TV series.

In late July 2016, Arlene Klasky stated that she would be willing to work on a revival of the series, along with co-creators Gabor Csupó and Paul Germain. In October 2016, a Nickelodeon senior vice president stated in response to a fan question that Rugrats was among other shows being considered for revival.

In mid-July 2018, it was announced that Nickelodeon had given a series order to a 26-episode revival of the series, executive produced by Klasky, Csupó, and Germain. In May 2020, it was announced that the revival series was delayed until 2021.

In late February 2021, it was announced that the reboot would premiere on Paramount+ in late spring 2021. A sneak peek was also uploaded to social media platforms. In March, an all-new cast for the parents were revealed.

The reboot premiered on Paramount+ on May 27, 2021 and began airing on Nickelodeon on August 20, 2021. A second batch of episodes was released on October 7, 2021. Regular Nickelodeon airings began on February 25, 2022.

On September 21, 2021, the series was renewed for a 13-episode second season. The series has a holiday episode that was released on December 2, 2021.

On July 21, 2022, it was announced that an additional 13 episodes had been ordered for season two, and that the series was renewed for a 13-episode third season.

On March 16, 2023, it was announced that season two will premiere on April 14, 2023.

Comparisons with original series
As a continuity reboot, the 2021 series has notable differences to the original 1991 series; some of which was done to accommodate the 30-year difference between the two. The most notable change came with the character Betty DeVille. Originally portrayed as a strong feminist woman with a "weak" husband in Howard, Betty is now portrayed as a lesbian, and Howard is absent. Betty's voice actress, Natalie Morales, stated about the change that "anyone who watched the original show may have had an inkling Betty was a member of the alphabet mafia."

Susie and the Carmichael family are already established as neighbors (as opposed to the 1991 series, when they debuted during its second season). Susie is also now two years old instead of three and is no longer able to talk to the adults. Charlotte Pickles also is present from the beginning; in the 1991 series, she did not appear until the second season, being an unseen character up until then. Kimi Watanabe is now three and a half years old, and has already moved with her mother Kira from Paris to the United States by the time she meets the cast. Kira and Chas meet in "Lucky Smudge", when it is revealed she won piano lessons he submitted for a raffle at a fair.

Fluffy, the cat already long belonging to Drew, Charlotte, and Angelica by the time of its first appearances in the original series, is adopted in "Fluffy Moves In" in this series.

Episodes

Shorts

Home media

Notes

References

External links 
 
 

Rugrats (franchise)
2020s American animated television series
2021 American television series debuts
American computer-animated television series
Animated television series reboots
Animated television series about children
Animated television series about families
Paramount+ original programming
Paramount+ children's programming
Nickelodeon original programming
Nicktoons
Television shows set in California
English-language television shows
American children's animated adventure television series
American children's animated comedy television series
Television series by Klasky Csupo